Peckham Rye  is a railway station in Peckham town centre, South London. It opened on 1 December 1865 for LC&DR trains and on 13 August 1866 for LB&SCR trains.

Layout and routes

Peckham Rye is a major interchange served by four different routes. Its platforms are on two separate viaducts with a single ticket hall at ground level. Platforms 1 and 2 are on the south viaduct and served by Southern services (London Bridge via Tulse Hill to Beckenham Junction and East Croydon), and London Overground services (Clapham Junction to Dalston Junction). Platforms 3 and 4 are on the north viaduct and served by Thameslink (Blackfriars to Sevenoaks) and Southeastern (Victoria to Dartford).

Station improvements

Refurbishment
Ticket gates were installed in May 2009 and during late 2010 the station was refurbished as part of a 'deep clean' by Southern. A former waiting room for platforms 2 and 3, bricked up for 55 years, was partially restored and temporarily re-opened with a permanent re-opening being planned.

Future improvements
Peckham Rye is planned to become a step-free station. The project was planned to be completed in 2021, but has been delayed to 2024. The step-free project, alongside a major station rebuild, is expected to request government funding in 2022, and if approved, construction will start in September 2023 and be completed in late Summer 2025.

Services
Services at Peckham Rye are operated by Southeastern, Southern, Thameslink and London Overground.

The typical off-peak service in trains per hour is:
 2 tph to 
 2 tph to London Blackfriars
 4 tph to 
 2 tph to  via 
 2 tph to  via 
 2 tph to  via 
 2 tph to  via 
 4 tph to 
 4 tph to  via 

Services are operated using a mixture of rolling stock including Class 376, 377, 378, 465, 466 and 700 EMUs.

Connections
London Buses routes 12, 37, 63, 78, 197, 343, 363, P12 and P13 and night routes N63 and N343 serve the station; some via the bus station.

In popular culture
In the first episode of The Sweeney, "Ringer", the station's platforms, steps, and entrance were filmed for Regan and Carter's chase on foot of Billy who had stolen Regan's girlfriend's car.

It is shown in the introduction of the Channel 4 show "Desmond's".

References

External links

Railway stations in the London Borough of Southwark
Former London, Brighton and South Coast Railway stations
Railway stations in Great Britain opened in 1865
Railway stations served by Southeastern
Railway stations served by London Overground
Charles Henry Driver railway stations
Railway stations served by Govia Thameslink Railway